Vaiden may refer to:

People

Kate Vaiden, a 1986 American novel by Reynolds Price, also the name of the narrator

Places
Vaiden, Alabama United States, an unincorporated community in Perry County
Vaiden, Mississippi, United States, a town in Carroll County